Bhadiad is a village located in Ahmedabad district, Gujarat, India.

The holy shrine of Bhadiyad Pir Dargah is located in Bhadiad.

References 

Villages in Ahmedabad district
Settlements in Gujarat